Mazu Daoyi (709–788) (Japanese: Baso Dōitsu) was an influential abbot of Chan Buddhism during the Tang dynasty. The earliest recorded use of the term "Chan school" is from his Extensive Records. 

He is most famously known for his two teaching statements: "This Mind is Buddha" (jixin shi fo) and "Ordinary Mind is the Way."

Biography
His family name was Ma – Mazu meaning Ancestor Ma or Master Ma. He was born in 709 northwest of Chengdu in Sichuan. During his years as master, Mazu lived in Jiangxi, from which he took the name "Jiangxi Daoyi".

In the Transmission of the Lamp, compiled in 1004, Mazu is described as follows:

According to the Transmission of the Lamp, Mazu was a student of Nanyue Huairang (677-744) at Mount Heng in Hunan

A story in the entry on Nanyue Huairang in the Transmission of the Lamp is regarded as Mazu's enlightenment-account, though the text does not claim it as such.
An earlier and more primitive version of this story appears in the Anthology of the Patriarchal Hall which was transcribed in 952:

This story echoes the Vimalakirti Sutra and the Platform Sutra in downgrading purificative and gradualist practices instead of direct insight into the Buddha-nature.

Mazu's Hongzhou school

Mazu became Nanyue Huairang's dharma–successor. Eventually Mazu settled at Kung-kung Mountain by Nankang, southern Kiangsi province, where he founded a monastery and gathered scores of disciples.

Traditionally, Mazu Daoyi is depicted as a successor in the lineage of Huineng, since his teacher Nanyue Huairang is regarded as a student and successor of Huineng. This connection between Huineng and Nanyue Huairang is doubtful, being the product of later rewritings of Chan history to place Mazu Daoyi in the traditional lineages.

Mazu Daoyi is perhaps the most influential teaching master in the formation of Chan Buddhism. While Chan became the dominant school of Buddhism during the Song dynasty, the earlier Tang dynasty and Mazu Daoyi's Hongzhou school became regarded as the "golden age" of Chan. The An Lushan Rebellion (755-763) led to a loss of control by the Tang dynasty, and metropolitan Chan began to lose its status while "other schools were arising in outlying areas controlled by warlords. These are the forerunners of the Chan we know today. Their origins are obscure; the power of Shen-hui's preaching is shown by the fact that they all trace themselves to Hui-neng."

This school developed "shock techniques such as shouting, beating, and using irrational retorts to startle their students into realization". These shock techniques became part of the traditional and still popular image of Chan masters displaying irrational and strange behaviour to aid their students. Part of this image was due to later misinterpretations and translation errors, such as the loud belly shout known as katsu. In Chinese "katsu" means "to shout", which has traditionally been translated as "yelled 'katsu'" – which should mean "yelled a yell"

During 845-846 staunchly Taoist Emperor Wuzong of Tang persecuted Buddhist schools in China along with other dissidents, such as Christians:

This persecution was devastating for metropolitan Chan, but the school of Mazu and his likes survived, and took a leading role in the Chan of the later Tang.

Teachings
Mazu Daoyi's teachings and dialogues were collected and published in his Jiangxi Daoyi Chanshi Yulu "Oral Records of Chan Master Daoyi from Jiangxi".

Buddha Nature
Though regarded as an unconventional teacher, Mazu's teachings emphasise Buddha-nature:

Shock techniques
Mazu Daoyi, in order to shake his students out of routine consciousness, employed novel and unconventional teaching methods. Mazu is credited with the innovations of using katsu (sudden shouts), keisaku (unexpected strikes with a stick) and unexpectedly calling to a person by name as that person is leaving. This last is said to summon original consciousness, from which enlightenment arises. Mazu also employed silent gestures, non-responsive answers to questions, and was known to grab and twist the nose of a disciple. Utilizing this variety of unexpected shocks, his teaching methods challenged both habit and vanity, a push that might inspire sudden kensho.

Subitism and dhyana (zazen)
A well-known story depicts Mazu practicing zazen but being rebuked by his teacher, Nanyue Huairang, comparing seated meditation with polishing a tile. According to Faure (Scholar), the criticism is not about dhyana as such, but "the idea of "becoming a Buddha" by means of any practice, lowered to the standing of a "means" to achieve an "end"". The criticism of seated dhyana reflects a change in the role and position of monks in Tang society, who "undertook only pious works, reciting sacred texts and remaining seated in dhyana". Nevertheless, seated dhyana remained an important part of the Chan tradition, also due to the influence of Guifeng Zongmi, who tried to balance dhyana and insight.  "How can you rest if the one that comes as the vanguard and leaves as the rearguard isn’t dead?", Dahui Zonggao.

Depiction in the later Koan literature 
Mazu appears in later Song dynasty Chan anthologies of transmission, encounter dialogue and koans:
 Transmission of the Lamp, compiled in 1004 by Shi Daoyuan 
 Blue Cliff Record. compiled with commentary by Yuanwu Keqin (1063–1135) circa 1125;
 The Gateless Gate compiled circa 1228 by Wumen Huikai (1183–1260).

Other anthologies where Mazu appears include:
 Records of Pointing at the Moon (compiled 1602),
 Recorded Saying of the Ancient Worthies (compiled 1271),
 Records of the Regular Transmission of the Dharma (1062).

Examples 
Mazu was particularly fond of using the kōan "What the mind is, what the Buddha is." In the particular case of Damei Fachang, hearing this brought about an awakening. Later this same statement was contradicted by Mazu when he taught the kung'an "No mind, No Buddha".:

Other examples of kōans in which Mazu figures are as follows:

Successors
Among Mazu's immediate students were Baizhang Huaihai (720-814) Nanquan Puyuan (748-835), Fenzhou Wuye (760-821), and Damei Fachang (752-839).

A generation later his lineage through Baizhang came to include Huangbo Xiyun (d.850), and his celebrated successor Linji Yixuan (d.866). From Linji Yixuan derived the Linji school and the Japanese sect, the Rinzai school.

A second line was Guishan Lingyou (771-853), to whom the Guiyang school was named, and therein Yangshan Huiji (807-883).

Criticism
The Hung-chou school has been criticised for its radical subitism.

Guifeng Zongmi (圭峰 宗密) (780–841), an influential teacher-scholar and patriarch of both the Chán and the Huayan school claimed that the Hung-chou tradition believed "everything as altogether true".

According to Zongmi, the Hung-chou school teaching led to a radical nondualism that believed that all actions, good or bad, are expressing the essential Buddha-nature, but therefore denies the need for spiritual cultivation and moral discipline. This was a dangerously antinomian view as it eliminated all moral distinctions and validated any actions as expressions of the essence of Buddha-nature.

While Zongmi acknowledged that the essence of Buddha-nature and its functioning in the day-to-day reality are but different aspects of the same reality, he insisted that there is a difference. To avoid the dualism he saw in the Northern Line and the radical nondualism and antinomianism of the Hung-chou school, Zongmi's paradigm preserved "an ethically critical duality within a larger ontological unity", an ontology which he claimed was lacking in Hung-chou Chan.

Notes

References

Book references

Web references

Sources

 
 
 )
 
 
 
 
 
 
 
 
 
 
 
 
 
 
 

 

Chinese scholars of Buddhism
Chan Buddhist monks
Tang dynasty Buddhists
709 births
788 deaths
Chinese Zen Buddhists
Founders of Buddhist sects